Bessacarr railway halt was a small halt on the Great Northern and Great Eastern Joint Railway in the suburbs of Doncaster, South Yorkshire, England.

The halt opened in 1912 but did not appear in public timetables and was closed in 1924.

The site of Bessacarr Halt, along with 7 others, was highlighted as a possible "new station" under a report to Doncaster Borough Council in September 2008, with reopening at some future date a possibility.

References 

Disused railway stations in Doncaster
Former Great Northern and Great Eastern Joint Railway stations
Railway stations in Great Britain opened in 1912
Railway stations in Great Britain closed in 1924